Shahrak-e Panjam is a village in Jannat Makan Rural District, in the Central District of Gotvand County, Khuzestan Province, Iran. At the 2006 census, its population was 518, in 89 families.

References 

Populated places in Gotvand County